Royal correspondent is the designation often assigned to a journalist who specialises in reporting on the goings on of royalty. Examples from the United Kingdom include Jennie Bond and Nicholas Witchell, both of the BBC.

See also
 Royal Rota

References

Mass media in the United Kingdom